

Bracket

Results

Quarter-finals

Semi-finals

Third-place playoff

Final

2015 CECAFA Cup